Westliche Günz is a river of Bavaria, Germany. At its confluence with the Östliche Günz near Lauben, the Günz is formed.

See also
List of rivers of Bavaria

References

Rivers of Bavaria
Rivers of Germany

de:Günz#Westliche Günz